Harpal Talhan (born February 8, 1965) is a retired Canadian lightweight boxer who contested in 18 fights and was the Canadian lightweight champion.

He currently resides in Surrey, B.C.-married with 3 children and is a businessman.

He fought in Canada and the US, including boxing in Las Vegas. In 1990, he took on the holder of the Canadian lightweight title John Kalbhenn in Toronto, Ontario, Canada and beat him to become the new Canadian lightweight champion.

External links
 

1965 births
Living people
Pakistani male boxers
Lightweight boxers